List of Afghan Rulers in present-day Afghanistan with capital at Kabul:

See also
Kabul Shahi (disambiguation)
Jayapala

References

History of Kabul
Political history of Afghanistan
Kabul
Afghanistan-related lists